Patricio Sebastián Galaz Sepúlveda (born 31 December 1976) is a former Chilean footballer who played as a striker.

Club career
He was born in Santiago, Chile and his main position on the team was that of a centre-forward. He previously played club football for Cobreloa in Chile, where he spent four years (2001–2004). He then spent the next two seasons with Mexican club Atlante F.C. He was known there as Patricio "El Pato" (The Duck) Galaz. He played there for 4 years also (1997–2000). In 2008, he was signed by Ñublense.

International career
At international level, Galaz played for Chile at youth level at the 1993 FIFA U-17 World Championship in Japan. At senior level, he represented his nation on 12 occasions between 2004 and 2006, and took part at the 2004 Copa América.

Personal life
Galaz is married to the Argentine model Gisela Molinero, who has worked in Chilean TV media.

Post retirement
Galaz graduated as a Football Manager in Argentina and since 2021 he worked as Sports Director of Cobreloa.

Honours

Club
 Universidad Católica
Chilean Primera División (1): 1997 Apertura
Copa Chile (1): 1995

Cobreloa
 Chilean Primera División (3): 2003 Apertura, 2003 Clausura, 2004 Apertura

International
Chile U17
 FIFA U-17 World Cup Third place: 1993

Individual
 Chilean Primera División Top Goalscorer: 2004 Apertura, 2004 Clausura
 IFFHS World's Best Top Division Goal Scorer: 2004

References

1976 births
Living people
Footballers from Santiago
Chilean footballers
Chilean expatriate footballers
Chile international footballers
Chile youth international footballers
Club Deportivo Universidad Católica footballers
Regional Atacama footballers
C.D. Antofagasta footballers
Coquimbo Unido footballers
Club Deportivo Palestino footballers
Cobreloa footballers
Atlante F.C. footballers
Universidad de Chile footballers
Ñublense footballers
Chilean Primera División players
Liga MX players
2004 Copa América players
Chilean expatriate sportspeople in Mexico
Expatriate footballers in Mexico
Chilean football managers
Association football forwards